Mickey 3D is a French rock group from Montbrison, Loire; it was founded in 1997 when Mickaël Furnon alias Mickey and Aurélien Joanin alias Jojo parted from the local group 3Dk.

They have fronted for the group Louise Attaque, which had them play before their concerts. In 1999 they recorded their first album, Mistigri Torture. Since that time, inspired by artists such as  Christophe Miossec, Mickey 3D have become known for rocking songs with critical lyrics and unusual sound elements. Their greatest commercially successful song, "Respire," reached Switzerland's top 10 in 2004.

Discography

Albums 
 First demo tapes: Le Souffle court (1996); Mickey 3D (1997); L'Amour (1998)
 Mistigri Torture (1999) – reedited by Virgin in 2000
 La Trêve (2001)
 Tu vas pas mourir de rire (2003)
 Live à Saint-Étienne (2004)
 Matador (2005)
 La grande évasion
 Sebolavy (2016)
 Nous étions des humains (2023)

Singles 
 "La France a peur" (2000)
 "Tu dis mais ne sais pas" (2001)
 "Jeudi pop pop" (2001)
 "Ma grand-mère" (2002)
 "Respire" (2003)
 "Yalil (La fin des haricots)" (2003)
 "Ça m'étonne pas" (2003)
 "Johnny Rep" (2004)
 "Matador" (2005)
 "Les Mots" (2005)
 "La Mort du peuple" (2006)
 "Méfie-toi l'escargot" (2009)
 "Sous le soleil" (2021)
 "Emilie dansait" (2022)

Awards 
 2003: Prix Constantin
 2004: Victoires de la musique
 Victoire for rock album of the year for Tu vas pas mourir de rire.
 Victoire for music video of the year for Respire.
 Victoire of original song of the year for "Respire."

External links 
 Official page

Musical groups from Auvergne-Rhône-Alpes
Organizations based in Saint-Étienne
Montbrison, Loire